Adolf Dietrich (November 9, 1877 – June 4, 1957) was a Swiss laborer and one of the most renowned naïve artists and Swiss painters of the 20th century.

Biography
Adolf Dietrich was born to poor farmers in the canton of Thurgau as the youngest of 7 children. Upon discovering his exceptional graphical talents, his schoolteacher suggested that he become a lithographer. His parents, however, refused since he was needed as a farmhand.

Dietrich lived in the house of his parents, as a bachelor, for the rest of his life. Because the small farm provided little income, he had to work as a homemaker and as a day laborer in a local textile mill and in the woods. He was only free to engage in drawing and painting on Sundays. His first sketchbook dates to 1896, his first paintings to 1900. He created his works without any training or examples; but he did heed the advice of passing landscape painters to trust in his powers of observation.

For years, Dietrich tried without success to have his works shown in public. After his works were first shown in Konstanz in 1913, he received some recognition in Germany, where he was associated with the Neue Sachlichkeit movement and called the "German Rousseau". Around 1916, he was discovered by art dealer Herbert Tannenbaum, who represented Dietrich until Tannenbaum fled Germany in 1937 due to the rise of the Nazi Party. In 1924, Dietrich was able to cease homemaking due to the income provided by the sale of his works in Germany.

Swiss museums and galleries slowly grew interested in Dietrich, and his international breakthrough came in 1937–1938, when the exposition Les maîtres populaires de la réalité in Paris and Zürich and an exhibition at the Museum of Modern Art in New York City fêted him as the principal representative of naïve art.

Dietrich retained his modest lifestyle in the face of sudden fame and demand for his works. However, he was industrious in marketing the output of the "master painter of Berlingen", as he then called himself.

Works
The motives of Dietrich's works are limited to his immediate surroundings in Berlingen, and include rural landscapes, animals, people and still lifes. He created all of his works at home in his room, using pencil sketches, self-made photographs, stuffed animals and books as models. Drawing on his powers of observation, Dietrich imbued his still life and animal paintings with a strong sense of materiality and executed them with what was for an untrained painter an exceptional precision. His images of people and scenes of the imagination, on the other hand, appear comparatively plain or even awkward.

At times, he used, upon his clients' wishes, cardboard stencils for the serial reproduction of particularly popular motifs. Only Dietrich's few late works prior to his death in 1957 indicated any stylistic development. The artistic merits of Dietrich's works are found in his strong intuitive sense of color, which intensifies the impact of his brightly colored works, and in his outstanding power of observation, which allowed him to combine precision with great attentiveness of his subjects.

Some of Dietrich's works are exhibited in the Kunstmuseum Winterthur, the Museum zu Allerheiligen in Schaffhausen and the Kunsthaus Zürich. In May–June 2010, his works were featured in the Swiss Institute Contemporary Art New York along with works by Richard Phillips.

Resales

Footnotes

External links
 
 
 
 Adolf Dietrich on kunstraum-kreuzlingen.ch

1877 births
1957 deaths
20th-century Swiss painters
People from Frauenfeld District
Swiss male painters
Swiss portrait painters
Naïve painters
20th-century Swiss male artists